Kalle Grünthal (born on 24 February 1960 in Türi) is an Estonian politician. He has been member of XIV Riigikogu.

2001-2004 he studied the law in University of Tartu. 

2002-2005 he was a member of Paide City Council.

Since 2017 he is a member of Estonian Conservative People's Party.

References

1960 births
21st-century Estonian politicians
Conservative People's Party of Estonia politicians
Living people
Members of the Riigikogu, 2019–2023
People from Türi
University of Tartu alumni